Floyd Lewis Wooldridge (August 15, 1928 – May 14, 2008) was an American professional baseball player. A right-handed pitcher, he appeared in 18 Major League Baseball games for the 1955 St. Louis Cardinals.

Career
Wooldridge started eight games during his MLB career. Both of his victories were complete-game efforts. On June 23, he defeated the Philadelphia Phillies 7–1 at Busch Stadium, scattering seven hits and issuing two bases on balls. On July 3, he defeated the Chicago Cubs 8–2 at Wrigley Field, giving up only five hits, walking three and striking out five.

In  major league innings, Wooldridge allowed 64 hits (including nine home runs) and 31 earned runs, walking 27 and striking out 14. During his minor league career (1950–53; 1955–57) he appeared in 193 games and posted a 59–62 won/lost record.

References

External links

 Baseball Almanac

1928 births
2008 deaths
Albany Cardinals players
American expatriate baseball players in Mexico
Baseball players from Missouri
Buffalo Bisons (minor league) players
Columbus Cardinals players
Columbus Jets players
Diablos Rojos del México players
Houston Buffaloes players
Major League Baseball pitchers
Mexican League baseball pitchers
People from Cedar County, Missouri
Rochester Red Wings players
St. Louis Cardinals players